Sarkaria may refer to:

 Ajeej Sarkaria (born 1995), Canadian soccer player
 Manprit Sarkaria (born 1996), Austrian footballer
 Prabmeet Sarkaria (born 1988), Canadian lawyer and politician
 Ranjit Singh Sarkaria (1916–2007), Indian Supreme Court justice
 Sarkaria Commission, an Indian constitutional commission headed by Ranjit Singh Sarkaria
 Sukhbinder Singh Sarkaria, Indian politician in Punjab